Royal Bercuit Golf Club is located in Grez-Doiceau, Wallonia, 30 km southeast of Brussels. The only course in Belgium designed by Robert Trent Jones, it has hosted events on both the European Tour and the Ladies European Tour.

History
In 1965, businessman and landowner Baron Frédéric Rolin began planning the construction of the golf course. Robert Trent Jones agreed to design the course and based on an American concept, the project included an 18 hole golf course and real estate development. Bercuit opened in 1967 and is the only Belgian golf course designed by Jones.

In 2017 the club was granted Royal status by King Philippe, an honor bestowed on its 50th anniversary.

Tournaments hosted

See also
List of golf clubs granted Royal status
List of golf courses designed by Robert Trent Jones

References

External links

Golf clubs and courses in Belgium
1967 establishments in Belgium
Sports venues in Walloon Brabant
Royal golf clubs